Xi'an International Trade & Logistics Park (XITLP) is an industrial park located in Xi'an, Shaanxi Province, China, serving as free trade zone dry port.

History
The park was founded in 2008 to create a transport hub in the inland water areas surrounding Xi'an. The Longhai Railway is located in the Xi'an International Trade & Logistics Park. It is the most busiest railway heading to China's Central plains.

References

External links
 Xi'an International Trade & Logistics Park (ITL)

Industrial parks in China
Economy of Xi'an
Special Economic Zones of China
Dry ports
Logistics in China